Parkin School District was a school district headquartered in Parkin, Arkansas. It operated Parkin Elementary School and Parkin Junior and Senior High School.

On September 7, 2005, it merged into the Wynne School District.

References

External links
 
 

School districts disestablished in 2005
2005 disestablishments in Arkansas
Education in Cross County, Arkansas
Defunct school districts in Arkansas
1971 establishments in Arkansas
School districts established in 1971